Ferroexpreso Pampeano S.A. (abbreviated FEPSA) is an Argentine private railway company that operates freight services over a   network that comprises broad gauge Sarmiento Railway and the Rosario and Puerto Belgrano section of Roca Railway.

FEPSA is currently owned by Sociedad Comercial del Plata (SCP), and Techint, two of the largest companies in Argentina. FEPSA's operating fleet includes 52 diesel locomotives and 2,106 wagons.

History 
After the entire Argentine rail network was privatised in the early 1990s, the Government of Argentina granted a concession to the company to operate freight services within provinces of Buenos Aires and La Pampa but with branches extending into neighbouring Córdoba, San Luis and Santa Fe provinces. The former Rosario and Puerto Belgrano Railway section is the most heavily used branch. Ferroexpreso Pampeano started operations in November 1991.

In 2014, Ferroexpreso Pampeano carried 350,000 tonnes of foodstuffs and 3,500,009 tonnes of freight in total.

Gallery

See also
Rail transport in Argentina
Domingo Sarmiento Railway
Railway privatisation in Argentina

References

External links 

 

Railway companies of Argentina
5 ft 6 in gauge railways in Argentina
Railway companies established in 1991
1991 establishments in Argentina
Techint
Rail transport in Buenos Aires Province
Transport in La Pampa Province